Agostino Crosti (February 16, 1896 – September 22, 1988), was an Italian dermatologist and professor of dermatology in Milan. Crosti's syndrome and Gianotti–Crosti syndrome are named after him.

References

1896 births
1988 deaths
Italian dermatologists
20th-century Italian physicians